Bonju (also Romanized as Bonjū) is a village in Bu ol Kheyr Rural District, Delvar District, Tangestan County, Bushehr Province, Iran. At the 2006 census, its population was 595, in 134 families.

References 

Populated places in Tangestan County